Andrei Makrov (born 14 December 1979) is an Estonian professional ice hockey player who plays for HC Viking of the Meistriliiga (EML).

Internationally, Makrov has represented Estonia and is the team's all-time goal-scoring and points leader in the World Championships.

References

External links

1979 births
Living people
Sportspeople from Tallinn
Estonian ice hockey right wingers
Estonian people of Russian descent
FoPS players
Molot-Prikamye Perm players
Torpedo Nizhny Novgorod players
Yunost Minsk players
HC Dinamo Minsk players
HK Gomel players
HK Acroni Jesenice players
Metallurg Zhlobin players
HK Neman Grodno players
Arystan Temirtau players
Gornyak Rudny players
HC Almaty players
Telford Tigers players
GKS Tychy (ice hockey) players
Expatriate ice hockey players in Russia
Estonian expatriate sportspeople in Belarus
Estonian expatriate sportspeople in Russia
Estonian expatriate sportspeople in England
Estonian expatriate sportspeople in Finland
Estonian expatriate sportspeople in Slovenia
Estonian expatriate sportspeople in Sweden
Estonian expatriate sportspeople in Kazakhstan
Estonian expatriate sportspeople in Poland
Estonian expatriate ice hockey people
Expatriate ice hockey players in Finland
Expatriate ice hockey players in England
Expatriate ice hockey players in Sweden
Expatriate ice hockey players in Belarus
Expatriate ice hockey players in Slovenia
Expatriate ice hockey players in Kazakhstan
Expatriate ice hockey players in Poland